Bernard Gavillet (born 6 March 1960) is a Swiss former professional racing cyclist. He rode in four editions of the Tour de France, two editions of the Giro d'Italia and one edition of the Vuelta a España.

References

External links
 

1960 births
Living people
Swiss male cyclists
Place of birth missing (living people)